Wappasening Creek is a  tributary of the Susquehanna River in  New York and Pennsylvania in the United States.

It rises in the southwest corner of Bradford County, Pennsylvania south of Canton, and flows east.

See also
List of rivers of New York
List of rivers of Pennsylvania

References

Rivers of New York (state)
Rivers of Pennsylvania
Tributaries of the Susquehanna River
Rivers of Tioga County, New York
Rivers of Bradford County, Pennsylvania